Bashir Taraki بشیر تره کی , son of Ali Mohammad Taraki, was born on 8 July 1980 in Kabul, Afghanistan.

Education
He completed his primary educations in Rabia Balkhi primary school and his secondary educations in Wazir Muhammad Akbar Khan secondary school and then he graduated from Naderia High School.
Due to his special interests in Sport, he started his Higher education at the University of Education in Faculty of Physical education training department in 2003 then in 2006 He honored the Diploma of the mentioned faculty in Kabul Afghanistan
.

Athletic background

During his studies in the physical department he was familiar with Olympic Games such as Football, Handball, Basketball, Wrestling, Boxing, Swimming, Table tennis, and Volleyball, and he was best player in the above-mentioned sports in his class.

He had much interest in Taekwondo, therefore he has started his Taekwondo exercises in 1990 under the supervision of respected Master Munir Ahmad and then in 1996 He earned black Belt.
He got several titles during the years that He have participated in different categories of match.
In the year 2000 he got the title of Afghanistan's Taekwondo Star in weight of (62)kg 
Then he became a member of Afghanistan's National Taekwodno Team .
In 2003 he participated in friendly Taekwondo competition between Afghan immigrations in Iran and he earned a gold medal in that competition 
Then in the same year he participated in goodwill international championships in India and he earned another gold medal for Afghanistan.

Then he was invited by the Afghanistan National Olympic Committee and Afghanistan National Taekwondo Federation to get the leader ship of Afghanistan National Taekwondo Team, and to work as Afghanistan National Taekwondo Team´s Coach

Then he accepted their invitation and became the trainer of Afghanistan National Taekwondo Team. He started the training of Afghanistan's National Team in 2003 till present. During his leadership, the Afghanistan's National Taekwondo Team had noteworthy achievements. Then Afghanistan's National Taekwondo Team participated in a variety of categories of competitions, ranging from regional matches to Asian Games to International Games and even the Olympic Games.
Rohullah Nikpai after seven decades earned the bronze medal for Afghanistan at the 2008 Summer Olympics.

Duty and responsibilities in Afghanistan´s National Olympic Committee and Taekwondo Federation

Director of implementation of competitions
International best and number one referee
Professional trainer
Deputy technical director of Social Association of Afghanistan, and one of the founders of the mentioned association
Afghanistan's national Taekwondo coach
Director of Munir Ahmad Taekwondo Association, which has 16 branches in Kabul and 14 branches in provinces

He is one of the critics of the national department of sport and National Olympics to defend the rights of athletes.

Medals
2012 Earned medals of Mir Masjidi khan and Ghazi Wazir Muhammad Akbar khan from President Hamid Karzai for our hard work and Rohullah Nikpai's Bronze Medal from London 2012 Olympic Games.

References

External links 
 Bashir Taraki´s Official Facebook Page

Olympic taekwondo practitioners of Afghanistan
Living people
1980 births
Sportspeople from Kabul